Air Base 115 Orange-Caritat ( or BA 115) is a French Air and Space Force (Armée de l'air et de l'espace) base in Vaucluse, France. It is equipped with one runway and was named after Maurice de Seynes, a French-Soviet aircraft pilot.

It hosts: 
 Escadron de Chasse 2/5 Île-de-France - Dassault Mirage 2000B & C
 Escadron d'Hélicoptères 5/67 Alpilles - Eurocopter Fennec
 Centre d'Instruction des Equipages d'Hélicoptères 341 Colonel Alexis Santini - Fennec
 a permanent Dépôt atelier munitions spécialisées detachment; this is a headquarters unit responsible for all special ammunition storage in France.
 escadron de défense sol-air 10.950 the base air defense unit.
 etablissement logistique du commissariat de l’air de Portes-les –valence, a logistic unit.
 a guard detachment Fusiliers Commandos de l'Air responsible for ground defense and base security.

References

External links 
 Base aérienne 115 Orange, official website 
 BA 115 at French Air and Space Force website 
 Escadron de Chasse 01.005 Vendée 
 Escadron de Chasse 02.005 IIe de France 
 Photos of Orange-Caritat Air Base 
 
 

French Air and Space Force bases
Vaucluse
Military airbases established in 1939